Vietnam national under-23, and Olympic football team  2009–present results.

Results

Keynotes

 * Vietnam's score always listed first
 (H) Home country stadium
 (A) Away country stadium
 (N) Neutral venue stadium
 1 Non FIFA 'A' international match

2020-present

2023

2022

2021

2020

2010–2019

2019

2018

2017

2016

2015

2014

2013

2012

2011

2010

2000–2009 results

2009

References

u23
National under-23 association football team results